Rubistella is a genus of flies in the family Empididae.

Species
R. mitis Garrett-Jones, 1940

References

Diptera of Africa
Empididae
Empidoidea genera
Insects described in 1940